Maju Dega is a Hindu temple dedicated to Shiva and it is located in Kathmandu Durbar Square, Nepal.

The temple was built by Riddhi Lakshmi, the Queen mother of Bhupetendra Malla in 1692. 1971 Indian film Haré Rama Haré Krishna was filmed on premises of the temple. The April 2015 Nepal earthquake completely destroyed the temple and it was being rebuilt in 2018.

Gallery

References 

Hindu temples in Kathmandu District
Kathmandu District
Kathmandu Durbar Square
World Heritage Sites in Nepal
17th-century establishments in Nepal